Abirabad may refer to:
 Abirabad, Razavi Khorasan
 Abirabad, Semnan